Vitalia Diatchenko and Irena Pavlovic were the defending champions, but both players chose not to participate.
Maria João Koehler and Katalin Marosi won the title, defeating Amanda Elliott and Johanna Konta 7–6(7–3), 6–1 in the final.

Seeds

Draw

Draw

References
 Main Draw

Aegon GB Pro-Series Shrewsbury - Doubles